Morchella also known as Morel is a species of edible wild mushroom.

Morel may also refer to:

Places 
 Mörel, Germany, municipality in Schleswig-Holstein
 Mörel, Switzerland a former municipality in Valais, now part of Mörel-Filet
 Morel, Les Allues, a hamlet and ski resort in the French Alps, close to Méribel
 Morel River, a river in India

Other uses 
 Morel (surname), a surname
 Morel (horse), a British Thoroughbred racehorse
 Morel Mackernasey, a fictional character in the manga series Hunter × Hunter
 The Invention of Morel or Morel's Invention a novel by Argentine writer Adolfo Bioy Casares.

See also
 Moral (disambiguation)
 Morell (disambiguation)
 Morrel (a family name in The Count of Monte Cristo)
 Morrell (surname)
 Mary Morrill (c. 1620–1704), maternal grandmother of Benjamin Franklin